Irina Vladimirovna Dvorovenko (born 28 August 1973) is a Ukrainian-American retired ballet dancer and actress. She was a principal dancer with the American Ballet Theatre.

Early life
Dvorovenko was born in Kyiv, Ukraine during the Soviet period. Her parents are dancers. She started with gymnastics before entering the Kyiv Ballet School at the age of ten.

Career

Ballet
In 1990, Dvorovenko joined the National Opera and Ballet Theatre of Kyiv as a soloist, and was promoted to principal dancer in 1992. When she was touring with the company, she and her colleagues decided to bring as much food back home as possible.

In 1996, Dvorovenko joined the American Ballet Theatre, and was promoted to soloist the following year. She became a principal dancer in 2000. She had danced many lead roles at the company, including Odette/Odile in Swan Lake, Aurora in The Sleeping Beauty and Kitri in Don Quixote.

In May 2013, Dvorovenko retired from ABT following a performance as Tatiana in Onegin, with Cory Stearns as the title role. She planned to perform as a guest artist.

Dvorovenko now coaches younger dancers at ABT along with her husband, Maxim Beloserkovsky. Dancers they coached include Skylar Brandt, for her debut as the title role in Giselle. She also runs a ballet intensive with Beloserkovsky.

Acting
In May 2013, she made her acting debut as Vera Baronova in the Encores! production of On Your Toes at New York City Center. Her performance received positive reviews.

In 2015, Dvorovenko starred in Starz TV series Flesh and Bone, as Kiira, an aging prima ballerina. The show was choreographed by Dvorovenko's former ABT colleague Ethan Stiefel.

In 2017,  Dvorovenko appeared as a recurring character in the fifth season of The Americans. She played a Soviet émigré, Evgheniya Morozova.

In March 2018 Dvorovenko returned to Encores! as Elizaveta Grushinskaya in Grand Hotel.

She has also appeared in the television series Forever,  The Blacklist and Power.

Personal life
Dvorovenko is married to Maxim Beloserkovsky, a fellow ABT principal dancer. They have a daughter, Emma Galina, born in 2005. Dvorovenko is a naturalised American citizen.

Selected repertoire

Terpsichore and Polyhymnia in Apollo
Mathilda Kchessinska and the Tsarina in Anastasia
Nikiya and Gamzatti in La Bayadère
The title role in Cinderella
Swanilda in Coppélia
Medora in Le Corsaire
Kitri and Mercedes in Don Quixote
Giselle, Myrtha and the peasant pas de deux in Giselle
Hanna Glawari and Valencienne in The Merry Widow
The Sugar Plum Fairy in The Nutcracker
Tatiana in Onegin
The Paquita pas de deux
The title role in Raymonda

Juliet in Romeo and Juliet
The Lilac Fairy and Princess Florine in The Sleeping Beauty
Odette-Odile in Swan Lake
The first and second movements in Symphony in C
The Sylvia Pas de Deux
Tchaikovsky Pas de Deux
Leading roles in Études
Petite Mort
Les Sylphides

Created roles
The Brahms/Haydn Variations

Awards
Diploma and the Grand Prix in the Junior Division of the Ukraine Ballet Competition, 1987
Diploma in the Junior Division of the Moscow Ballet Competition, 1988
Silver Medal at the Jackson International Ballet Competition, 1990
Bronze Medal at the International Ballet Competition in Osaka, Japan, 1991
Gold Medal and the "Anna Pavlova" Prize at the International Ballet Competition in Moscow, 1992
The Grand Prix at the International Ballet Competition Serge Lifar in the Ukraine, 1994
Source:

References

External links
 
 
 Звонкий голос балета, или Как сказал Петипа сто лет назад. Интервью с балериной Ириной Дворовенко. Беседовала Александра Свиридова

1973 births
Living people
Dancers from Kyiv
Ukrainian ballerinas
American Ballet Theatre principal dancers
21st-century Ukrainian actresses
Ukrainian emigrants to the United States
21st-century ballet dancers
21st-century American dancers
Prima ballerinas
Naturalized citizens of the United States